Farnesyl diphosphatase (EC 3.1.7.6, FPP phosphatase) is an enzyme with systematic name (2E,6E)-farnesyl-diphosphate diphosphohydrolase. It catalyses the reaction 

 (2E,6E)-farnesyl diphosphate + H2O  (2E,6E)-farnesol + diphosphate

The enzyme is involved in the biosynthesis of acyclic sesquiterpenoids.

References

External links 
 

EC 3.1.7